The baht (sign: ฿; code: THB) is the official currency of Thailand. It is divided into 100 satang. The issuance of currency is the responsibility of the Bank of Thailand. SWIFT ranked the Thai baht as the 10th-most-frequently used world payment currency as of January 2019.

History 
 

The Thai baht, like the pound, originated from a traditional unit of mass. Its currency value was originally expressed as that of silver of corresponding weight (now defined as 15 grams), and was in use probably as early as the Sukhothai period in the form of bullet coins known in Thai as phot duang. These were pieces of solid silver cast to various weights corresponding to a traditional system of units related by simple fractions and multiples, one of which is the baht. These are listed in the following table:

That system was in use up until 1897, when the decimal system devised by Prince Jayanta Mongkol, in which one baht = 100 satang, was introduced by his half-brother King Chulalongkorn along with the demonetization of silver bullet coins on 28 October 1904 after the end of silver bullet coin production by the opening of Sitthikarn Royal Mint in 1857. However, coins denominated in the old units were issued until 1910, and the amount of 25 satang is still commonly referred to as a salueng, as is the 25-satang coin.

Until 27 November 1902, the baht was fixed on a purely silver basis, with 15 grams of silver to the baht. This caused the value of the currency to vary relative to currencies on a gold standard. From 1856 to 1864, the values of certain foreign silver coins were fixed by law, with 5 baht = 3 Spanish dollar = 7 Indian rupees. Before 1880 the exchange rate was fixed at 8 baht per pound sterling, falling to 10 to the pound during the 1880s.

In 1902, the government began to increase the value of the baht by following all increases in the value of silver against gold but not reducing it when the silver price fell. Beginning at 21.75 baht per pound sterling, the currency rose in value until, in 1908, a fixed peg to the British pound sterling was established of 13 baht per pound. This was revised to 12 baht in 1919 and then, after a period of instability, to 11 baht in 1923. During World War II, the baht was fixed at a value of one Japanese yen on 22 April 1942.

From 1956 until 1973, the baht was pegged to the US dollar at an exchange rate of 20.8 baht = one dollar and at 20 baht = 1 dollar until 1978.
 A strengthening US economy caused Thailand to re-peg its currency at 25 to the dollar from 1984 until 2 July 1997, when the country was affected by the 1997 Asian financial crisis. The baht was floated and halved in value, reaching its lowest rate of 56 to the dollar in January 1998. It rose to 30 per dollar in January 2021. 

The baht was originally known to foreigners by the term tical, which was used in English language text on banknotes until the series 2 1925.

Coins 
Cowrie shells from the Mekong River had been used as currency for small amounts since the Sukhothai period. Before 1860, Thailand did not produce coins using modern methods. Instead, a so-called "bullet" coinage was used, consisting of bars of metal, thicker in the middle, bent round to form a complete circle on which identifying marks were stamped. One gold baht was generally worth 16 silver baht. Between 1858 and 1860, foreign trade coins were also stamped by the government for use in Thailand.

Rama III (1824–1851) was the first king to consider the use of a flat coin. He did so not for the convenience of traders, but because he was disturbed that the creatures living in the cowrie shells were killed. When he learned of the use of flat copper coins in Singapore in 1835, he contacted a Scottish trader, who had two types of experimental coins struck in England. The king rejected both designs. The name of the country put on these first coins was Muang Thai, not Siam.

In 1860, modern style coins were introduced. These were silver 1 sik, 1 fuang, 1 and 2 salung, 1, 2 and 4 baht, with the baht weighing 15.244 grams and the others weight-related. Tin 1 solot and 1 att followed in 1862, with gold , 4 and 8 baht introduced in 1863 and copper 2 and 4 att in 1865. Copper replaced tin in the 1 solot and 1 att in 1874, with copper 4 att introduced in 1876. The last gold coins were struck in 1895.

In 1897, the first coins denominated in satang were introduced, cupronickel , 5, 10 and 20 satang. However, 1 solot, 1 and 2 att coins were struck until 1905 and 1 fuang coins were struck until 1910. In 1908, holed 1, 5 and 10 satang coins were introduced, with the 1 satang in bronze and the 5 and 10 satang in nickel. The 1 and 2 salung were replaced by 25 and 50 satang coins in 1915. In 1937, holed, bronze  satang were issued.

In 1941, a series of silver coins was introduced in denominations of 5, 10 and 20 satang, due to a shortage of nickel caused by World War II. The next year, tin coins were introduced for 1, 5 and 10 satang, followed by 20 satang in 1945 and 25 and 50 satang in 1946. In 1950, aluminium bronze 5, 10, 25 and 50 satang were introduced whilst, in 1957, bronze 5 and 10 satang were issued, along with 1-baht coins struck in an unusual alloy of copper, nickel, silver and zinc. Several Thai coins were issued for many years without changing the date. These include the tin 1942 1 satang and the 1950 5 and 10 satang, struck until 1973, the tin 1946 25 satang struck until 1964, the tin 50 satang struck until 1957, and the aluminium bronze 1957 5, 10, 25 and 50 satang struck until the 1970s. Cupronickel 1-baht coins were introduced in 1962 and struck without date change until 1982.

In 1972, cupronickel 5-baht coins were introduced, switching to cupronickel-clad copper in 1977. Between 1986 and 1988, a new coinage was introduced, consisting of aluminium 1, 5 and 10 satang, aluminium-bronze 25 and 50 satang, cupronickel 1 baht, cupronickel-clad-copper 5 baht and bimetallic 10 baht. Cupronickel-clad-steel 2 baht were introduced in 2005.

In 2008, the Ministry of Finance and the Royal Thai Mint announced the 2009 coin series, which included changes in materials to reduce production costs as well as an update of the image on the obverse to a more recent portrait of the king. The two-baht coin, confusingly similar in color and size to the one-baht coin, was changed from nickel-clad low-carbon steel to aluminium bronze. New two-baht coin was the first of the new series released on February 3, 2009, followed by a satang coin in April, a five-baht coin in May, a ten-baht coin in June, and a one-baht coin in July 2009.

In 2018, the Royal Thai Mint and the Ministry of Finance issued a new series of general circulation coins, featuring the same standard specifications, but feature a portrait of its current king, Maha Vajiralongkorn.

Remarks 
 The 1, 5 and 10 satang are used only internally between banks and are not in circulation.
 Older coins, some of which are still in circulation, had only Thai numerals, but newer designs also have Arabic numerals.
 The standard-issue 10-baht coin has, at the 12 o'clock position on the reverse, raised dots corresponding to Braille cell dot 1 and dots 2-4-5, which correspond to the number 10.
 10-baht coins are very similar to 2-euro coins in size, shape and weight, and are likewise bi-metallic, although they are worth only 25 eurocents. Vending machines not equipped with up-to-date coin detectors might therefore accept them as €2 coins or old Italian 500 lira coins as well.
 Many commemorative 1-, 2-, 5- and 10-baht coins have been made for special events. There also are 20-, 50-, 100-baht base metal commemorative coins and higher-denomination precious metal coins as well.

In February 2010 the Treasury Department of Thailand stated that it has been planning a new circulation 20-baht coin.

Banknotes 

After 1857, notes for 20 and 40 ticals were issued, also bearing their values in Straits dollars and Indian rupees. Undated notes were also issued before 1868 for 5, 7, 8, 12 and 15 tamlueng, and 1 chang. One att notes were issued in 1874.

In 1892, the treasury issued notes for 1, 5, 10, 40, 80, 100, 400 and 800 ticals, called "baht" in the Thai text.

On September 19, 1902, the government introduced notes which were printed by Thomas De La Rue & Company Limited, England, during the reigns of kings Rama V and Rama VI, denominated 5, 10, 20, 100 and 1000 ticals, still called baht in the Thai text — each denomination having many types, with 1 and 50 tical notes following in 1918. In 1925, notes were issued in denominations of 1, 5, 10, 20, 100 and 1,000 baht with the denomination in both Arabic and Thai numerals without English text; English speakers continued to refer to these as "ticals".

On 27 July 2010, the Bank of Thailand announced that the 16th-series banknotes would enter circulation in December 2010. On 9 August 2012, the Bank of Thailand issued a new denomination banknote, 80 baht, to commemorate queen Sirikit's 80th birthday. It was the first Thai banknote that featured Crane's Motion security thread.

In 2017, the Bank of Thailand announced a new family of banknotes in remembrance of its late king Bhumibol Adulyadej (Rama IX). The notes are the same size and dimensions as the "Series 16" banknotes, with the front designs as before, but the back designs featuring images of the king's life in infancy, adolescence and maturity. The new family of banknotes were issued on September 20.

In 2018, the Bank of Thailand announced a new family of banknotes featuring a portrait of its current king, Maha Vajiralongkorn.
The main colors and dimensions of the notes are the same as before, with the back designs featuring images of the Kings of Thailand from past to present. The 20, 50 and 100 baht banknotes were issued on Chakri Memorial Day, April 6, 2018. The final two denominations, 500 and 1,000 baht were issued on the anniversary of the birth of King Maha Vajiralongkorn, July 28, 2018.

Images of banknotes have been removed lest they infringe copyright, but may be viewed at the Thai-language article linked in the margin.

Money and unit of mass
Ngoen (เงิน) is Thai for "silver" as well as the general term for money, reflecting the fact that the baht (or tical) is foremost a unit of weight for precious metals and gemstones. One baht = 15.244 grams. Since the standard purity of Thai gold is 96.5 percent, the actual gold content of one baht by weight is 15.244 × 0.965 = 14.71046 grams; equivalent to about 0.473 troy ounces. 15.244 grams is used for bullion; in the case of jewellery, one baht should be more than 15.16 grams.

Exchange rates

The Bank of Thailand adopted a series of exchange controls on 19 December 2006, which resulted in a significant divergence between offshore and onshore exchange rates, with spreads of up to 10 percent between the two markets. Controls were broadly lifted on 3 March 2008 and there is now no significant difference between offshore and onshore exchange rates.

(Source 1999–2013: usd.fx-exchange.com)

(Source 2014–2020: Bank of Thailand)

See also 
 Economy of Thailand
 Stock Exchange of Thailand

References 

 Sources

 Cecil Carter eds. , The Kingdom of Siam 1904, reprint by the Siam Society 1988, chapter X Currency and Banking

External links
  Compare exchange rates of the Thai Baht from many bank in Thailand.
  The banknotes of Thailand

Currency symbols
Currencies of Thailand
Units of mass